Sébastien Meoli (born 2 August 1980) is a Swiss-Italian professional footballer currently playing for Lausanne-Sport.

Honours 
Sion
Swiss Cup: 2005–06

References

External links
 

1980 births
Living people
Sportspeople from Lausanne
Swiss men's footballers
Italian footballers
Association football defenders
FC Lausanne-Sport players
FC Sion players
Yverdon-Sport FC players
Swiss Super League players
Swiss Challenge League players
Swiss people of Italian descent
Italian people of Swiss descent